George E. Sykes (born June 3, 1951) is an American politician serving as a member of the New Hampshire House of Representatives from the Grafton-13 district since December 5, 2012, and a member of the Lebanon City Council from Ward 2 since 2019. Sykes is a member of the Democratic Party.

Sykes was born in Providence, Rhode Island, in 1951 and lives in Lebanon, New Hampshire. In Lebanon, Sykes served as Deputy Fire Chief. Sykes served on the Lebanon City Council from 2008 to 2010, before taking a position with the American Red Cross providing relief to Haiti following the 2010 earthquake. In 2012, he was first elected to the New Hampshire House of Representatives. He is married and has one child.

During the 2018 New Hampshire House of Representatives election, Sykes pledged to introduce legislation banning single-use plastic bags, as well as look into the issues refugees face in getting driver's licenses.

References 

People from Lebanon, New Hampshire
1951 births
Democratic Party members of the New Hampshire House of Representatives
Bridgewater State University alumni
Southern New Hampshire University alumni
Empire State College alumni
New Hampshire city council members
American firefighters
Politicians from Providence, Rhode Island
Living people
21st-century American politicians